Hope Elementary School District is an elementary school district in Santa Barbara, California. The district headquarters is adjacent to the Hope School.  Anne Hubbard is the superintendent.

Schools:
 Hope Elementary School
 First opened prior to 1888; it closed in 1977 due to a lack of students but reopened in September 1997.
 Monte Vista School
 Opened in 1966
 Vieja Valley School
 Opened in 1961

Closed:
 Pedregosa School - Established 1870

References

External links
 

Santa Barbara, California
Education in Santa Barbara County, California
School districts in California
1888 establishments in California
School districts established in 1888